The Flying Fool is a 1929 thriller play by the British writer Arnold Ridley and Bernard Merivale. It enjoyed a successful run in the West End.

Adaptation
In 1931, the play was adapted into a film of the same title directed by Walter Summers and starring Henry Kendall and Benita Hume.

References

Bibliography
 Goble, Alan. The Complete Index to Literary Sources in Film. Walter de Gruyter, 1999.
 Kabatchnik, Amnon. Blood on the Stage, 1925-1950: Milestone Plays of Crime, Mystery, and Detection : an Annotated Repertoire. Scarecrow Press, 2010.

1929 plays
Plays by Bernard Merivale
Plays by Arnold Ridley
West End plays
Plays set in London